SJK(C) Taman Connaught is a government primary school situated in Taman Connaught, Cheras, Kuala Lumpur, Malaysia. 'SJK(C)' is an acronym of 'Sekolah Jenis Kebangsaan (Cina)' in the Malay language which roughly means 'Government Chinese Primary School'.

Events
1985: Minister of Education (Malaysia), Abdullah Badawi (former Prime Minister of Malaysia) approved a construction of a Chinese primary school in Cheras, codenamed 'SJK(C) Taman Connaught'.
1988: The construction of SJK(C) Taman Connaught which had sixteen class rooms began on a   plot in Cheras.
1989: The school officially opened in December. There are 683 students and twenty teachers. The first headperson of the school is '张世禄'(pinyin(romanized Chinese): Zhang Shi Lu, Teoh Su Lock), the CEO is '拿督刘钦团'(pinyin: Dato' Liu Qin Tuan PJK), and the head of 'teachers and parents association' is '翁权波'(pinyin:Weng Quan Bo)
1992: The former canteen was reconstructed into four classrooms, and new canteen, basketball court, reading corner and car parking place were constructed. The school roll had increased to 1700 students and there were thirty six classrooms.
1994: The school was officially specified as class 'A' school. The headteacher, Zhang Shi Lu (Teoh Su Lock) retired, and Guan Hui Min (关惠民) became the next headteacher.
1995: The Ministry of Education of Malaysia, JPM(Malay: Jabatan Pendidikan Malaysia), allocated funds for the construction of a new science laboratory and a new workshop.
1996: The community donated RM 400 000 (RM: Malaysian Ringgit(currency)) to the school to build a new big hall.
1997: The new big hall was completed. The headteacher Guan Hui Min was transferred to SJK(C) Lai Meng, and replaced by Lai Mu Lan(赖慕兰).
1999: A new four story, fifteen classroom new building was constructed. The school now had 2300 students in forty seven classroom. The school was being renovated. The teachers' office, science laboratory, music room, computer room, auditorium, counselling room, dental room, library and the administration office were expanded.
2012:It has 54 classes and over 50 classrooms. 

Schools in Kuala Lumpur
Educational institutions established in 1989
1989 establishments in Malaysia